Vice lantråd is the title of the Deputy Head of Government of the Åland Islands, an autonomous and unilingually Swedish-speaking territory of Finland.

The current vice lantråd is Mr. Harry Jansson.

List of Deputy Premiers of the Åland Islands (1988–Present):
May Flodin (1988–1991)
Harriet Lindeman (1991–1995)
Roger Nordlund (1995–1999)
Olof Salmén (1999–2001)
Olof Erland (2001–2003)
Jörgen Strand (2003–2007)
Britt Lundberg (2007–2011)
Roger Nordlund (2011–2015)
 Camilla Gunell (2015-2019)
 Harry Jansson (2019-)

See also
Lantråd
Government of Åland
Parliament of Åland

External links
The Åland Government
The Åland Parliament

Politics of Åland